The Union of South Africa King's Medal for Bravery, Silver is the lesser of two classes of a South African civil decoration for acts of bravery that was in use from 1939 to 1952, when the country was a constitutional monarchy in the British Commonwealth. The medal was instituted by King George VI on 23 June 1939.

Institution
The Union of South Africa King's Medal for Bravery, Silver, the lesser of two classes of South Africa's highest civilian decoration for bravery, was instituted by Royal Warrant of 23 June 1939, published in Government Gazette no. 2671 dated 25 August 1939, and amended by Royal Warrants of 18 February 1947, 24 October 1949 and 17 October 1950.

Award criteria
The medal was awarded to recognise gallantry performed in the face of imminent and obvious peril by those residents of the Union of South Africa or its dependent territories who endangered their own lives in the act of saving, or endeavouring to save, the lives of others.

Although it was primarily a civilian award, it was also granted to military personnel for non-combatant acts of gallantry during the Second World War.

Order of wear
In the British order of precedence, the Union of South Africa King's Medal for Bravery, Silver ranks as a third level decoration, equivalent to the Queen's Gallantry Medal. It is preceded by the Indian Distinguished Service Medal and succeeded by the Distinguished Service Medal.

In South Africa, the medal is ranked as a second level decoration and, despite its status, it has no post-nominal letters. It is preceded by the Louw Wepener Decoration and succeeded by the South African Police Cross for Bravery.

Description
Obverse
The decoration is struck in silver and is a disk, 38 millimetres in diameter with a raised rim and a large ring suspender. The obverse depicts the crowned effigy of King George VI, facing left, surrounded by the words "GEORGIVS VI REX ET IMPERATOR".

Reverse
A public competition was held to find a suitable design for the reverse of the medal. The winning entry, by Miss Renee Joubert, depicts the 18th-century Cape hero Wolraad Woltemade on his horse, rescuing shipwreck survivors from a stormy sea. As a result, the medal became commonly referred to as the Woltemade Medal. The image is circumscribed with the words "FOR BRAVERY • VIR DAPPERHEID" around the top.

Ribbon
The ribbon is 44 millimetres wide and dark blue with 4½ millimetres wide orange edges.

Discontinuation
Upon the accession to the British Throne of Queen Elizabeth II on 15 December 1952, the Union of South Africa King's Medal for Bravery, Silver was discontinued and replaced by the Union of South Africa Queen's Medal for Bravery, Silver.

Recipients
The Union of South Africa King's Medal for Bravery, Silver was awarded to altogether thirty-four individuals, of whom eighteen were military personnel.

References

068
Civil awards and decorations of the United Kingdom
Awards established in 1939